Paulina Constancia (born Maria Paulina Constancia Cornejo Lee) is a Filipino-Canadian artist born on December 1, 1970 in Cebu City, Philippines. She works primarily on canvas, textiles, found materials and sometimes incorporating stitching and her art can primarily be viewed at the Paulina Constancia Museum of Naïve art (MoNA). She has been acknowledged one of the most prolific female artists in Cebu.

Career 
Constancia began painting in the early 1990s. Constancia and her art were featured on the back cover of the December 1997 Asian-Pacific edition of Reader's Digest  She has exhibited her art in places all over the globe, from places like the Philippines, Indonesia, Thailand, Malaysia, to the Netherlands, Mexico, Greece, Slovenia and Poland. She has also been to various cities in the U.S. & Canada.

In 1997, Constancia was presented by the Philippine Centennial Coordinating Council of Northeast U.S. in a show called Here's to Sunny at the Philippine Center in New York City. 

From 2012 to 2015, Constancia had an art blog called Daily Dose of Art (DDoA). 

In 2013 and 2014 Constancia's collection "Moments of Motherhood" (MOM) was exhibited in Japan, Malaysia, and Indonesia.

In 2016, Paulina was one of the 8 naive artists invited to participate in the 49th International Meeting of Naïve Artists at the Trebnje Gallery of Naïve Artists in Slovenia. In 2020, Paulina's art "Covid Times at the Park" was the feature/cover piece for the XIII Art Naif Festiwal (naif art festival) in Katowice, Poland. 

Paulina is currently based in Canada and actively creates art in her home studio, blogs, and teaches arts and crafts.

Style 
Constancia is a self-described multifaceted artist and has described her art as naive art. She is best known for bright-colored and whimsical narratives painted on quilts and tiles that are also shown and reflected in her writing. Sunstar Dailys Leticia Suarez said of her work, "Her paintings are like a breath of green air in the local art scene. It's like going from the dusty street into a woody hide-away that's full of magical secrets."

Writing 
She has published a bilingual collection of poetry called Brazos Abiertos/Open Arms (World Poetry Publishing, Vancouver 2003)  and short stories Cuentos Hispano-filipinos/Hispano-Philippine Stories (Central Books, Manila, 2009).

References

External links 
 
 DAILY DOSE OF ART  As prescribed by Paulina Constancia
 Her illustrations can also be seen in this blog: Utok Pinoy
 PAULINA CONSTANCIA MoNA  MUSEUM OF NAÏVE ART
 Philippine Centennial Coordinating Council of Northeast USA

1970 births
Living people
People from Cebu City
Artists from Cebu
Filipino painters
Filipino women painters